Goski may refer to:

Kasper Goski 16th century Polish doctor, astrologer and the mayor of Poznań
A number of villages in Poland, including:
Boruty-Goski
Goski-Pełki
Tarnowo-Goski
Goski Duże